The Lola T300 was an open-wheel formula race car, designed, developed and built by Lola Cars, for Formula 5000 racing, in 1971.

References

T300
Formula 5000 cars